Asian Nigerians are Nigerian citizens whose ancestry lies within the continent of Asia. It also refers to Asian-born persons currently living in Nigeria. By mid-2008, Filipino residents in the country had increased to an estimated 4,500, up from 3,790 in December 2005. There is a large population of Chinese people in Nigeria which comprise Chinese expatriates and descendants born in Nigeria with Chinese ancestry. As at 2012, there are approximately 20,000 Chinese in Nigeria.

Asian immigration to Nigeria

In 1930, colonial Nigeria's census showed four Chinese immigrants residing there. Hong Kong investors started opening factories in Nigeria as early as the 1950s. By 1965 there were perhaps 200 Chinese people in the country. By 1999, that number had grown to 5,800, including 630 from Taiwan and 1,050 from Hong Kong. Filipinos arrived in Nigeria as early as the 1970s; the Philippine Barangay Society of Nigeria was founded in 1973 in an effort to coordinate the various Filipino community organisations that had already sprouted up around the country.

Notable people
Brian Fok, footballer
Hamisha Daryani Ahuja, actress, producer, director and businesswoman
Sunil Vaswani, businessman
Ruby Hammer, makeup artist

See also

Nigerian people
Chinese diaspora
Asia Town

References

 
Ethnic groups in Nigeria